Luka Matkava is rugby union player who plays for the Black Lion in the Rugby Europe Super Cup and Currie Cup Division One. As well as playing for the Lelos internationally.

Career 
Matkava began his senior career at RC Armazi in the Georgian Didi 10, scoring 6 tries in 7 appearances.

In 2021 he was named in the initial Black Lion squad for the inaugural Rugby Europe Super Cup season. Making his debut off the bench against Tel Aviv Heat in the second round.

International career 
Matkava made his international debut coming off the bench against Uruguay in the 2022 Autumn internationals.

He again came off the bench in the Georgian's historic victory against Wales, he slotted the winning penalty in the 77th minute to seal the victory.

International tries

Honours 
2021 Rugby Europe Super Cup

2022 Rugby Europe Super Cup

References 

2001 births
Living people
Rugby union players from Georgia (country)
Rugby union fly-halves
The Black Lion players
Georgia international rugby union players